The Toyota 1HZ is an engine developed by Toyota Motor Corporation for the Toyota Land Cruiser and the Toyota Coaster Bus of 1990. It replaced the previous (2H) heavy duty engine which was being used in older Toyota Land Cruiser models.

This engine generates more power and torque than previous diesel Toyota Land Cruiser engine. Despite being 30 years old, the 1HZ still sees use in Landcruiser 70 Series production worldwide with the exception of petrol-only markets and Euro 4 and Australian markets, where the 1GR-FE and 1VD-FTV Turbo-Diesel is supplied respectively. A popular engine in the 80 series Land Cruiser, it replaced the 2H engine in the 80/85 series by 1990.

The 1HZ Toyota Landcruiser 4.2 litre (4164 cc) diesel inline 6-cylinder 12-valve SOHC (overhead camshaft) is of the IDI or indirect injection design, and delivers maximum power of

The 5-cylinder variant of this engine is known as 1PZ.

See also
Toyota KZ engine

References

External links

 Rebuilding a 1HZ Motor 

HZ
Diesel engines by model
Straight-six engines